Devaughn Omari Elliott (born 28 October 1991 in Saint Kitts and Nevis) is a Kittian international footballer.

He recorded his first goal in international play during the qualifying campaign for 2014 FIFA World Cup.

Club career

Village Superstars 
Devaughn Elliott started his career in the Saint Kitts Premier Division at a young age playing for Village Superstars FC.

W Connection 
In 2013, Elliott signed with W Connection in the TT Pro League.

Pasaquina 
In June 2015, after being spotted during the 2018 FIFA World Cup qualification playing vs El Salvador, Elliott signed a 1-year contract with Salvadoran Primera División club, Pasaquina.

Elliott debuted with Pasaquina FC on August 1, 2015, playing 90 minutes in a 1–1 home tie vs Sonsonate. He scored his first goal in a 1–1 home tie vs historic contender Águila on August 26, 2015.

Murciélagos FC 
After an impressive Apertura 2015 tournament in El Salvador, Elliott transferred to Murciélagos FC for an undisclosed amount. Pasaquina FC retains a stake on the potential future resale of the player.

Initially, Elliott began playing with Murciélagos B due to the first team having already reached its foreign players quota for the 2015/2016 season. He scored his first goal for Murcielagos B in a 1-0 win against Alacranes de Durango on March 5, 2016.

Antigua GFC 
Elliot signed with Antigua GFC of Guatemala in 2017.

Return to Pasaquina 
Elliot signed again with Pasaquina for the Clausura 2018. His debut on his return was a 0–1 defeat against FAS at the Estadio Óscar Alberto Quiteño.

International career 
At the youth level he played in 2007 CONCACAF U17 Tournament qualifiers and 2011 CONCACAF U-20 Championship qualifiers, scoring six goals in their 19–0 win over the British Virgin Islands in the latter competition. He later played in 2012 CONCACAF Men's Pre-Olympic Tournament qualification, where he scored against Antigua and Barbuda and Saint Kitts and Nevis.

Elliott made his senior debut in a friendly against Jamaica on 16 August 2009. In November 2015, the team traveled to Europe for matches against Andorra and Estonia, the nation's first matches in history against European opponents. Elliott scored the only goal in the 1–0 victory over Andorra, becoming the first St. Kitts and Nevis player to score against a European side in the process. The result was also the first away victory for a CFU team over a European side on their home soil.

International goals 
Score and result list Saint Kitts and Nevis's goal tally first.

References

External links 

Segunda Division profile
Goal.com – Devaughn Elliott stats

1991 births
Living people
Saint Kitts and Nevis footballers
Saint Kitts and Nevis international footballers
Saint Kitts and Nevis youth international footballers
Association football midfielders
Village Superstars FC players
W Connection F.C. players
C.D. Pasaquina footballers
Murciélagos FC footballers
Pittsburgh Riverhounds SC players
Antigua GFC players
TT Pro League players
Primera División de Fútbol Profesional players
Ascenso MX players
Liga Nacional de Fútbol de Guatemala players
Saint Kitts and Nevis expatriate footballers
Saint Kitts and Nevis expatriate sportspeople in Trinidad and Tobago
Saint Kitts and Nevis expatriate sportspeople in El Salvador
Saint Kitts and Nevis expatriate sportspeople in Guatemala
Expatriate footballers in Trinidad and Tobago
Expatriate footballers in El Salvador
Expatriate footballers in Mexico
Expatriate footballers in Guatemala
Saint Kitts and Nevis under-20 international footballers